Segerstedt is a Swedish surname. It may refer to:
Amy Segerstedt (1835–1928), Swedish teacher and philanthropist, founder of the Braille Loan Library in Stockholm
Erik Segerstedt (born 1983), Swedish singer
Torgny Segerstedt (1876–1945), Swedish scholar of comparative religion and newspaper editor-in-chief
Torgny T:son Segerstedt (1908–1999), son of Torgny Segerstedt, Swedish philosopher and sociologist
Ingrid Segerstedt Wiberg (1911–2010), daughter of Torgny Segerstedt, Swedish journalist and politician

Swedish people